Sumar is a village in the municipality of Tytsjerksteradiel, in the province of Friesland, the Netherlands.

There is a windmill in the village, De Hoop.

History 
The village was first mentioned in 1453 as suwamer, and means "southern lake". Sumar developed in the late middle ages as a collection of spread out farms around the church. The Dutch Reformed church was built in 1769 as a replacement of an earlier church.

Sumar was home to 457 people in 1840. Around 1900, the heath in the area was cultivated. The dairy factory De Harste was built 1908 and is a combination of rational and Jugendstil architecture. The north of the village near the  started to industrialize. 

The school teacher Kornelis Lieuwes de Vries developed the Bintje potato in 1898 which became one of the most popular potato varieties. The potato was named after the 17-year old Bintje Jansma, one of his students, in 1905.

Gallery

References

Populated places in Friesland
Tytsjerksteradiel